The NoSleep Podcast is an anthology horror fiction podcast.

History overview 

NoSleep began as a subreddit, or forum, on Reddit where people would exchange scary stories and frightening experiences. With the popularity of NoSleep, a member named Matt Hensen proposed the idea of creating a podcast where the top stories from the NoSleep subreddit would be narrated in an audiobook style. The idea was well received and a few months later a small group of members released the first episode of The NoSleep Podcast. During their first two seasons, David Cummings assumed the role of host and producer, working with volunteer Redditors to help narrate and produce content for the show.

The popularity of The NoSleep Podcast rapidly grew as the production quality became more professional. Regular voices on the show who provide narration for its stories include David Cummings, Jessica McEvoy, Peter Lewis, Nikolle Doolin, Nichole Goodnight, David Ault, Jeff Clement, Erika Sanderson, Addison Peacock, Mike DelGaudio, Atticus Jackson, Dan Zappulla, James Cleveland, Elie Hirschman, Kyle Akers, Alexis Bristowe, Jesse Cornett, Mick Wingert, and Erin Lillis. Despite horror arguably being a traditionally male-dominated genre, many of the narrators and authors of stories featured on the show, and also half of its 2 million regular monthly listeners are female.

Self-taught composer Brandon Boone, who joined The NoSleep Podcast in 2013, became responsible for the majority of the show’s music by Season 5. The NoSleep Podcast theme was written by David Cummings and has evolved with each season of the show. The show also works with a number of artists to create original illustrations for each episode. New episodes typically air every Sunday and contain five or six stories per episode, not including bonus releases. Every year the show also produces a new collection of the flash stories in their “Suddenly Shocking” series and a retro radio drama series, “Old Time Radio”. In 2015, the podcast was downloaded 600,000 times.

The NoSleep Podcast has also featured stories from authors who have gone on to publish their works, including the “Penpal” series from Dathan Auerbach, “99 Brief Scenes from the End of the World” by T.W. Grim, “What Happens When the Stars Go Out” by Jesse Clark, and “Psychosis" by Matt Dymerski. The NoSleep Podcast is also one of the few podcasts in its genre that pays its creative contributors.

Special guests that have appeared on the podcast include Mike Flanagan, Kate Siegel, Samantha Sloyan, Elijah Wood, and Kurtis Conner.

Season Pass program
The NoSleep Podcast began as a volunteer endeavor, with all expenses being paid for out of pocket by its core team. As the quality of the show increased, expanding from a 30-minute format to over two hours per episode, the show announced that it had become unsustainable without outside funding. Just before the release of its 3rd Season The NoSleep Podcast unveiled the Season Pass Program, whereby listeners pay a one-time subscription fee each season to have access to 25 full length episodes, in addition to a selection of subscriber-exclusive bonus episodes. This is unique in that fans of the show (referred to as the "Sleepless") who are not a part of the program still receive free access to shorter versions of each episode, generally consisting of the first one or two stories, as they’re released. The Season Pass Program has been successful in not only sustaining the show, but also in allowing David Cummings to focus full-time on production. It also allowed the show to expand releases to a weekly schedule.

Seasons of the NoSleep Podcast contain at least 25 episodes which each run for approximately one hour. Season Pass membership includes bonus stories in each episode, increasing each episode's typical length to over two hours. As a bonus, Season Pass members are also awarded three additional episodes throughout the season. The NoSleep Podcast is supported by most podcast apps available for iPhone, Android, iOS, and Windows. The season pass is also available to stream from most podcast apps, though it is slightly more limited (Spotify currently does not support the NoSleep Podcast's season pass).

Episodes

Season 1

Season 2

Season 3 
*Free Story

Season 4 
*Free Story

Sleepless Tours
In October 2016, The NoSleep Podcast announced its “Sleepless Tour 2017”. The tour presented a series of 16 live shows across the continental US, featuring many of the popular voices from the show. In addition to publicity on Facebook, the tour was announced during an episode of the show. Another live event was undertaken in October 2017, with another live tour titled "Escape the Black Farm" following in March 2018.

In October 2019 a US-based Halloween tour was launched, ending at The Stanley Hotel on Halloween. In January 2020 the team toured the UK and Europe, with host David Cummings and most of the UK-based narrators.

Awards
The NoSleep Podcast has won two Parsec awards and has been a finalist seven additional times. It is also a finalist for an Audio Verse Award.
2018 Parsec Award Finalist for Best Speculative Fiction Story: Small Cast (Short Form) for “What Happens When The Stars Go Out” by Jesse Clark.
2016 Audio Verse Award Finalist for Best Fan/Adaptation Production.
2015 Parsec Award Finalist for Best Speculative Fiction Magazine or Anthology Podcast.
2015 Parsec Award Finalist for Best Speculative Fiction Story: Small Cast (Short Form) for “A Story to Scare My Son” by R.D. Ovenfriend.
2015 Parsec Award Finalist for Best Speculative Fiction Story: Small Cast (Short Form) for “The Mummer Man” by Stan Studdens.
Winner of the 2014 Parsec Award for Best Speculative Fiction Magazine or Anthology Podcast.
2014 Parsec Award  Finalist for Best Speculative Fiction Story: Small Cast (Short Form) for A Christmas Feast by Michael Whitehouse.
2014 Parsec Award Finalist for Best Speculative Fiction Story: Small Cast (Short Form) for Just Another Night by Andrew MacDougall.
Winner of the 2013 Parsec Award for Best New Speculative Fiction Podcaster/Team.
2013 Parsec Award Finalist for Best Speculative Fiction Magazine or Anthology Podcast.

See also 

 Horror podcast

References

External links

Official website
The NoSleep Podcast on Facebook
The NoSleep Facebook Community
The NoSleep Podcast on Twitter
The NoSleep Podcast on iTunes

2011 podcast debuts
Audio podcasts
Horror podcasts
Horror short stories